David or Dave Rogers may refer to:

Arts and entertainment
 David Rogers (singer) (1936–1993), American country music singer
 D.V. Rogers (born 1968), New Zealand performance installation artist
 David Clayton Rogers (born 1977), American film producer, writer and actor
 David Rogers (film editor) (fl. 1996–present), American television editor, director and producer

Politics and law
 David McGregor Rogers (1772–1824), Canadian farmer and political figure in Upper Canada
 David Rogers (Canadian politician) (1829–1909), Canadian merchant, shipbuilder and politician in Prince Edward Island
 David Dickson Rogers (1845–1915), Canadian politician
 David Rogers (North Carolina politician) (born 1965), American politician in the North Carolina House of Representatives
 Dave Rogers (Massachusetts politician) (fl. 2019–present), American politician in the Massachusetts House of Representatives

Sports
 David Rogers (footballer) (1892–?), English football (soccer) player
 Dave Rogers (Australian footballer) (1942–2000), Australian footballer for Carlton Football Club
 David Rogers (racing driver) (1955–2020), American racing driver
 Dave Rogers (NASCAR) (born 1974), American auto racing crew chief
 Dave Rogers (footballer, born 1975), English footballer

Others
 David Rogers (librarian) (1917–1995), British bibliographer
 David Rogers (priest) (1921-2020), British Anglican priest
 David Rogers (meteorologist) (born 1957), British atmospheric scientist

See also
 David Rodgers (disambiguation)
 David Roger (born 1961), American attorney
 Rogers (surname)